The Great Synagogue of Bordeaux is the main synagogue of Bordeaux, France.

Background and description

Sephardic Jews first came to Bordeaux following their expulsion from the Iberian Peninsula in 1492 due to the Alhambra decree. Their numbers were boosted in the 1960s by Jews who left the newly decolonised former French colonies in North Africa.

The building was the first major synagogue built after Napoleon emancipated France's Jews; it was finished in 1812. In 1873, it was destroyed by fire, being rebuilt nine years later. The new building on a new site was designed by Charles Bruguet, followed by Charles Durand and Paul Abadie. The 660,000 French franc cost came from donations, including significant contributions from the Sephardic Jewish Pereire banking family, as well as from local and national government. It was France's biggest synagogue when it was reopened.

While the first synagogue was built in the Neoclassical style, the current one combines Romanesque and Byzantine Revival. While there are some elements of Oriental styles, it is not built in the Moorish Revival style that was popular for other synagogues at the time. There are two towers on the facade, similar to bell towers on church facades; some contemporary Jews criticised the design for looking too like a church, and refused to give over funding for the towers to be topped with bulbs. At the top of the facade there is a sculpture of the Tablets of Stone bearing the Ten Commandments.

Recent events
During the German occupation of France in World War II, Jews were interned at the synagogue before being deported to concentration camps; the building was then pillaged. After the war, restoration took place and the building returned to its original plan in 1956.

In July 1998, the synagogue was classed as a monument historique.

References

External links

Bordeaux
Buildings and structures in Bordeaux
Buildings and structures completed in 1882
Romanesque Revival architecture in France
Byzantine Revival architecture in France
Monuments historiques of Gironde
Bordeaux
Sephardi Jewish culture in France
19th-century architecture in France